Jógvan Justinusson was, from 1629 to 1654, Lawman of the Faroe Islands.

Jógvan Justinusson came from Hattarvík in the Faroe Islands. Before he became lawman, he also served as part of the Faroese Løgting.

References

Løgtingið 150 – Hátíðarrit. Tórshavn 2002, Bind 2, S. 366. (Avsnitt Føroya løgmenn fram til 1816) (PDF-Download)
G.V.C. Youngs standardverk Færøerne – fra vikingetiden til reformationen, 1982

Lawmen of the Faroe Islands
17th-century heads of government
Year of birth unknown
Year of death unknown
Members of the Løgting